Richard Gonzalez (born 24 May 1969), better known by his stage name Richard "Humpty" Vission, is a Canadian house music producer, remixer, and DJ.

Biography 
He was raised in Highland Park, in Los Angeles, California, and graduated from Benjamin Franklin High School in 1987.

On the airwaves, Richard is host of the longest-running mix show in the US, Power Tools, which airs every Sunday morning from 2:00 to 4:00 on KPWR (Power 106 FM) in Los Angeles, as well as other syndicated markets.

Awards 
2006 Ranked 2nd as America's Favorite House DJ according to BPM Magazine

Discography

Continuous DJ mixes 
1992 This Is a Test vol. 1
1994 This Is a Test vol. 2
1995 This Is My House
1996 House Nation
1997 Drop That Beat
1997 The House Connection Vol. 1 (with Bad Boy Bill)
1998 House Connection Vol. 2 (with Bad Boy Bill)
2000 Shut the F**k Up and Dance
2001 Damn That DJ Made My Day
2004 Big Floor Funk
2005 Automatic
2013 House Connection Vol. 3 (with Bad Boy Bill)

Charted singles

Other singles
1999 "The Muzik" (feat. Nina Lares)
2000 "Shut the Fuck Up and Dance" (as Adrenaline)
2001 "Damn That DJ Made My Day" (as Adrenaline)
2004 "Never Let Me Down"
2004 "Sexy"
2004 "Been a Long Time"
2004 "Higher"
2004 "Freaks (Keep Rockin')"
2011 "Boombaa EP"

Productions
2013 Britney Spears - "Don't Cry"
2014 Havana Brown - "Whatever We Want"

Remixes 
1995 Taylor Dayne - "Say a Prayer" - Vission & Lorimer Mix (with Peter Lorimer)
1995 Raw Stylus - "Believe in Me" -Vission & Lorimer mix
1995 Miranda - "Round and Round" - AJ & Humpty mix
1995 The Shamen - "Destination Escaton" - Vission & Lorimer mix
1995 Ace of Base - "Beautiful Life" - Vission and Lorimer mix
1995 Crystal Waters - "Relax" - Vission and Lorimer mix
1999 Madonna - "American Pie" - RHV Radio Edit/Richard "Humpty" Vission Visits Madonna
2000 Madonna - "Music" - RHV Phunkatron Remix/Radio Mix/Dub
2001 Madonna - "What It Feels Like for a Girl" - RHV Velvet Masta Remix/Edit
2001 Madonna - "Don't Tell Me" RHV Remix/Radio Mix
2002 Felix da Housecat featuring Miss Kittin - "Madame Hollywood"
2003 Madonna - "Die Another Day" - RHV Electrofried Remix/Radio Mix
2003 Andrea Doria - "Bucci Bag" - RHV Pro-Funk Mix
2004 Sting - "Stolen Car" - RHV Remix
2004 Utada - "Devil Inside" - The RHV Experience Mix
2005 The Pussycat Dolls - "Stickwitu" - Richard Vission Remixes
2005 The Bravery - "Fearless" - RHV Remix
2005 The Killers - "Mr. Brightside" - RHV Remix
2005 Usher - "Caught Up" - RHV Remix
2006 The Perfects - "Shipwrecked" - RHV Remix (still in production)
2006 Under the Influence of Giants - "Mama's Room" - RHV Remix (still in production)
2006 David Bowie - "Let's Dance" - Richard Vission Mix
2006 Hilary Duff - "Play With Fire" - Richard Vission Remixes
2006 Nelly Furtado - "Maneater" - Richard Vission Remix
2006 Nelly Furtado - "Promiscuous" -Promiscuous Vission Remix
2006 Justin Timberlake - "Sexyback" - Vission's Back Remix
2006 Gnarls Barkley - "Crazy" - Crazy Vission Remix
2006 Stranger Days - "Somebody" - RHV Remix
2006 KoЯn - "Coming Undone" - RHV Remix
2007 Timbaland - "The Way I Are" - Richard Vission Remixes
2007 Hilary Duff - "Stranger" - Richard Vission Remixes
2007 Hilary Duff - "Dignity" - Richard Vission Remixes
2007 Hilary Duff - "With Love" - Richard Vission Remixes
2008 Lady Gaga - "Just Dance" - Richard Vission Remixes
2008 Hilary Duff - "Reach Out" - Richard Vission Remixes
2008 OneRepublic - "Apologize" - Richard Vission Remixes
2009 The Black Eyed Peas - "Meet Me Halfway" - Richard Vission Solmatic Remix
2009 Eva Simons - "Silly Boy" - Silly Boy (Remixes)
2009 Pussycat Dolls - "Bottle Pop" - Richard Vission Remixes
2009 Hilary Duff - "Any Other Day" - Richard Vission Remixes
2010 Enrique Iglesias - "Tonight (I'm F**kin You)" - Richard Vission Solmatic Remix
2010 Lady Gaga - "Bad Romance"
2012 Madonna - "Turn Up The Radio" - Richard Vission Speakers Blow Remix
2012 Havana Brown - "One Way Trip"
2012 Cheryl - "Call My Name" - Richard Vission Remixes
2012 will.i.am - "This Is Love" - Richard Vission Solmatic Remix
2013 Britney Spears - "Work Bitch" - Richard Vission Remixes

See also 
List of number-one dance hits (United States)
List of artists who reached number one on the US Dance chart

References

External links 
Official site
Power Tools Mix Show

Discogs

1973 births
Living people
Club DJs
Remixers
Canadian house musicians
Canadian techno musicians
Canadian expatriate musicians in the United States
Musicians from Toronto
Musicians from Los Angeles
DJs from Los Angeles